Bo Luang is a tambon (subdistrict) of Hot District, in Chiang Mai Province, Thailand. In 2019 it had a total population of 12,143 people.

Administration

Central administration
The tambon is subdivided into 13 administrative villages (muban).

Local administration
The whole area of the subdistrict is covered by the subdistrict municipality (Thesaban Tambon) Bo Luang (เทศบาลตำบลบ่อหลวง).

References

External links
Thaitambon.com on Bo Luang

Tambon of Chiang Mai province
Populated places in Chiang Mai province